The Atkinson Candy Company is a candy company based in Lufkin, Texas, best known for producing the Chick-O-Stick.

History
Atkinson Candy Company is a private company founded in 1932 by B.E. Atkinson, Sr., and his wife, Mabel C. Atkinson. It started when Basil E. Atkinson made two-day treks to Houston to purchase candy and tobacco, then he would sell it to mom-and-pop shops on the return trip.

The company currently operates out of a  facility, and is led by Eric Atkinson, grandchildren of the founders. The third and fourth generations of the Atkinson family are now running the Atkinson Candy Company.

Judson-Atkinson Candies
In 1983, Atkinson purchased another local company, the Judson Candy Company, later known as Judson-Atkinson Candies, from the Pearl Brewing Company. Judson-Atkinson was founded in 1899, and was based in San Antonio, Texas. In 2011, Judson-Atkinson shut down business due to the high prices of sugar and raw materials. Judson-Atkinson Candy Company used about four million pounds of sugar each year to make their bulk candies.

Product line

Atkinson Candy Company specializes in peanut butter and peppermint-flavored candies. The current product line includes the Chick-O-Stick, Coconut Long Boys, peanut brittle, mint twists, Peanut Butter Bars, and holiday candy. Atkinson also produces a premium hard candy line known as Gemstone Candies. In 2013, Atkinson acquired the candies Black Cow, Slo Poke and Sophie Mae from 
The Warrell Corporation. In 2019, they reached a licensing agreement with Spangler Candy Company to make the former Necco candy, Mary Janes.

References

Confectionery companies of the United States
Food and drink companies established in 1932
Lufkin, Texas
Companies based in Texas
1932 establishments in Texas